Orthotylus calichi is a species of bug from a family of Miridae that is endemic to Sardinia.

References

Insects described in 1980
Endemic arthropods of Sardinia
calichi